Leonard Christian Halmrast (October 10, 1899 – February 7, 1979) was a politician from Alberta, Canada. He served in the Legislative Assembly of Alberta from 1945 to 1967 as a member of the Social Credit caucus in government. He held various portfolios in the cabinet of Premier Ernest Manning from 1953 to 1967.

Political career
Halmrast first ran for a seat to the Alberta Legislature as a Social Credit candidate in a by-election held in the electoral district of Warner on August 6, 1945. He defeated H.J. Hierath, who ran as a Single Tax candidate, in a landslide to hold the seat for his party.

In the 1948 general election Halmrast defeated Liberal candidate William Colliton in a two-way race.

In the 1952 general election Halmrast defeated Liberal candidate George Snow by a landslide in his third two-way race in a row.

Premier Ernest Manning appointed Halmrast to his cabinet in 1953. Halmrast served as Minister of Public Welfare until January 5, 1954; he was then appointed Minister of Agriculture.

In the 1955 general election Halmrast defeated Liberal candidate J.L. Evans by a smaller margin than in earlier elections.

In the 1959 general election Halmrast defeated Liberal candidate Mark Stringam in his fifth consecutive straight fight.

On October 15, 1962, Premier Manning shuffled Halmrast back to the Public Welfare portfolio.

Redistribution in 1963 saw the electoral district of Warner merged with Taber to become Taber-Warner.  In the election held that year Halmrast was returned to office by acclamation. This was the last time that a candidate was elected unopposed to the Alberta legislature.

Halmrast retired from the assembly at dissolution in 1967.

References

External links
Legislative Assembly of Alberta Members Listing

Alberta Social Credit Party MLAs
1899 births
1979 deaths
Members of the Executive Council of Alberta